The Maldon grain riots took place in the English town of Maldon in March 1629, during a time of industrial depression and poor harvests. Starvation and high food prices in Essex increased the strain on the primarily agrarian economy of the area. Due to a decline in the English cloth trade in January 1629, exports of grain increased with little left for domestic consumption.  In March 1629, a 100- to 140-strong group of rioters led by one "Captain" Ann Carter, the wife of a butcher, boarded a Flemish grain ship and removed grain by filling their caps and gowns. The primary involvement of women in the riot was attributed to the fact that it was common for a husband to be held legally accountable for the actions of his wife at the time (refer to Legal rights of women in history).

After two weeks of attempting to prosecute the rioters, the local magistracy granted a lower purchase price of corn.

Ann Carter toured the local area after the riot to raise local support from clothing workers. A further riot on May 22 attracted the attention of the Privy Council. A special commission was established, which led to the execution of Ann Carter as a threat to the social order.

References

External links
 The Maldon Brewing Company named one of their brews after Captain Ann 

History of Essex
1629 in England
Feminism and history
Food riots
Protests in England
Riots and civil disorder in England
Maldon, Essex
17th-century riots